The Essex Act 1987 is a local Act of Parliament (citation 1987 c. xx) whose effect is to give additional local powers to Essex County Council, local authorities in the county as well as the Crouch Harbour Authority. The Act encompasses a number of powers affecting aspects of issues relating to land and open space (especially parking); highways and streets; public health and amenities; public order and safety, seashore and safety (specifically in the districts of Basildon, Castle Point, Chelmsford, Colchester, Maldon, Rochford, Southend-on-Sea, Tendring, Thurrock); some finance and other miscellaneous powers and other specific measures relating to named places including Colchester, Crouch Harbour, The Marshes (in the Epping Forest district), and Southend-on-Sea

The most notable clause in the law is section 6, allowing the prohibition of parking on grass verges which elsewhere has been a news making problem.

References

External links
 http://www.opsi.gov.uk/acts/localact1987/pdf/ukla_19870020_en.pdf

United Kingdom Acts of Parliament 1987
Political history of Essex
Acts of the Parliament of the United Kingdom concerning England
1980s in Essex